Brodmann area 25 (BA25) is the subgenual area, area subgenualis or subgenual cingulatea area in the cerebral cortex of the brain and delineated based on its cytoarchitectonic characteristics.

It is the 25th "Brodmann area" defined by Korbinian Brodmann (thus its name).
BA25 is located in the cingulate region as a narrow band in the caudal portion of the subcallosal area adjacent to the paraterminal gyrus.  The posterior parolfactory sulcus separates the paraterminal gyrus from BA25.  Rostrally it is bound by the prefrontal area 11 of Brodmann.

History
Brodmann described this area as it is labeled now in 1909.  Originally in 1905, Brodmann labeled the area as part of area 24.  In 1909, he divided the area into area 24 and 25.

Function
This region is extremely rich in serotonin transporters and is considered as a governor for a vast network involving areas like hypothalamus and brain stem, which influences changes in appetite and sleep; the amygdala and insula, which affect the mood and anxiety; the hippocampus, which plays an important role in memory formation; and some parts of the frontal cortex responsible for self-esteem. This region is particularly implicated in the normal processing of sadness.

Involvement in depression

The subcallosal cingulate gyrus CG25 which consists of BA25 as well as parts of BA24 and BA32 has been implicated as playing an important role in major depression and has been the target of deep brain stimulation to treat the disorder.

One study found that BA25 is metabolically overactive in treatment-resistant depression.  A different study found that metabolic hyperactivity in this area is associated with poor therapeutic response of persons with major depressive disorder to cognitive-behavioral therapy and venlafaxine.

In 2005 Helen S. Mayberg and collaborators described how they successfully treated a number of depressed people—individuals virtually catatonic with depression despite years of talk therapy, drugs, and electroconvulsive therapy—with pacemaker-like electrodes (deep brain stimulation) in area 25.

In 2013, Walker and Lawson conducted neurofeedback research with 183 subjects experiencing drug resistant depression. The neurofeedback specifically targeted Brodmann area 25. The treatment consisted of 6 neurofeedback sessions that were 20min long each over the course of 3 weeks. 1 year after the treatment 84% of subjects experienced over a 50% reduction in depression symptoms. 9% reported a 20-50% reduction in depression symptoms. 7% reported a 0-20% improvement. 1% initially reported positive effects, but had a depression relapse before the year follow up completed. There were no side effects or complications reported from the treatment.

A recent study found that transcranial magnetic stimulation is more clinically effective treating depression when targeted specifically to Brodmann area 46, because this area has intrinsic functional connectivity (negative correlation) with area 25.

Another recent study has found that the responses of area 25 to viewing sad stimuli are affected by cortisol.  This suggests that depression related changes in the activity in area 25 could be due to hypothalamic–pituitary–adrenal axis dysregulation.

Image

See also

 Brodmann area
 List of regions in the human brain
 Biology of depression

Notes and references

25
Serotonin
Neuroscience of depression
Medial surface of cerebral hemisphere